Red Ribbon Blues is a 1996 comedy-drama with classic heist/caper elements and written and directed by Charles Winkler and starring Paul Mercurio, RuPaul, and Debi Mazar. The film played the gay and lesbian film festival circuit in 1996.

Synopsis
Troy (Paul Mercurio) and Duke (RuPaul) have attended dozens of funerals for friends who have died of AIDS. Many of them were unable to afford the prohibitively expensive drugs they needed to stay alive. With their own funds running low, Troy and Duke decide to stage a series of robberies, stealing supplies of the life-saving drugs. Their heists are so successful that they're soon able to begin distributing medications throughout the community.

Cast
 Paul Mercurio as Troy
 Debi Mazar as Darcy
 RuPaul as "Duke"
 John Epperson as Harold
 Lisa Waltz as "Bones"
 David Spielberg as Yorkin
 Leland Orser as James
 Alan Boyce as Craig
 Gabriella Lamiel as Nadine Scott
 Robert Sherman as Alex
 Steve Park as Kris Lee
 Margo Winkler as Helen
 Lee Mathis as Francis
 Paul Bartel as Fred, The Pharmacist
 Charles Winkler as Angry Man With Shotgun

Reception
Steve  Persall of the Tampa Bay Times praised the film, comparing its "lighter-in-tone" storyline to Robin Hood. He rated the film with a B+.

Awards and nominations
It was nominated for a Special Grand Prize at Deauville Film Festival.

References

External links 
 

1996 films
1996 comedy-drama films
1990s heist films
American LGBT-related films
American comedy-drama films
American heist films
HIV/AIDS in American films
Films scored by John Frizzell (composer)
1996 LGBT-related films
1990s English-language films
Films directed by Charles Winkler
1990s American films